Barḥadbshabba of Ḥulwān was a 7th-century theologian and Christian bishop of the Church of the East who wrote many religious works and a history of the School of Nisibis which is of historical interest.

Barhadbeshabba was a partisan of the theologian Henana of Adiabene, although he evidently was not caught up in his downfall. He probably wrote his "On the Reason of the Schools", a history of the schools of Nisibis and Edessa, while a student at the school in Nisibis. In 605 he became the bishop of Holwan (modernly, near the western border of Iran). He was a signatory to the results of a synod called in 605 by Patriarch Gregory. Barhadbeshabba also wrote controversial and exegetical works.

A French translation of Barhadbeshabba's "On the Reason of the Schools" was published in 1907 by Addai Scher, a Chaldean Catholic archbishop.

Some scholars identify Barhadbeshabba of Holwan with Barhadbshabba Arbaya, writer of an important church history, who was also at the school in Nisibis.

Notes

Bibliography

7th-century bishops of the Church of the East
7th-century writers
Christians in the Sasanian Empire